Miss Universe Croatia is a beauty pageant which decides Croatia's contestant at the Miss Universe finals.

History
Miss Universe Croatia has been held annually since 1997 in under Vladimir Kraljevic who also successfully took the official franchise of Miss Universe Slovenia in 2013. In 2015 Barbara Ljiljak of Split-Dalmatia won the 2015 edition of the pageant but was not able to participate in Miss Universe due to an arm injury. 2nd-Runner Up of Miss Universe Croatia 2015 Mirta Kuštan of Krapinske Toplice took over as Croatia's representative to Miss Universe 2015. Ljiljak was never stripped of her title.

Titleholders

2015

Miss Universe Croatia 2015, the 19th Miss Universe Croatia pageant, was held on June 7, 2015 in the Crystal Ballroom at Hotel Westin in Zagreb, Croatia. Ivana Mišura, Miss Universe Croatia 2014 of Zagreb crowned Barbara Ljiljak as her successor at the end of the event. Ljiljak broke her arm days before the Miss Universe 2015 competition began and was replaced by Mirta Laura Kustan as Croatia's representative to Miss Universe that year. Ljiljak retained the title. Twenty contestants from across Croatia competed for the crown.

Results

Contestants
20 Contestants were selected from across Croatia, below are Miss Universe Croatia candidates in the Top 20 of the pageant selection.

2016

Miss Universe Croatia 2016, the 20th Miss Universe Croatia pageant, was held on April 15, 2016 in the Crystal Ballroom at Hotel Westin in Zagreb, Croatia. Barbara Ljiljak, Miss Universe Croatia 2015 of Split-Dalmatia crowned Barbara Filipović as her successor at the end of the event. 
Nineteen contestants from across Croatia competed for the crown.

Results

Contestants

2019

2021

References

External links
Official Miss Universe Croatia website

Beauty pageants in Croatia
Croatia
Recurring events established in 1997
1997 establishments in Croatia
Croatian awards